The 5th Assembly District of Wisconsin is one of 99 districts in the Wisconsin State Assembly. Located in northeast Wisconsin, the district comprises most of the eastern half of  Outagamie County, including the city of Kaukauna, as well as the town of Hobart in western Brown County.  The district also includes nearly all of the Oneida reservation spanning the two counties. The district is represented by Republican Joy Goeben, since January 2023. The 5th Assembly district is located within Wisconsin's 2nd Senate district, along with the 4th and 6th Assembly districts.

History

The district was created in the 1972 redistricting act (1971 Wisc. Act 304) which first established the numbered district system, replacing the previous system which allocated districts to specific counties.  The 5th district was drawn with novel boundaries in southeast Outagamie County and part of southwest Brown County.  The majority of the population of the new district came from Appleton suburbs in what had previously been the Outagamie County 3rd district. The last representative of the Outagamie 3rd district, William J. Rogers, was elected as the first representative of the 5th Assembly district in the 1972 election.

Other than the 1982 court ordered redistricting plan, which temporarily moved the 5th district to Milwaukee County, the district has remained in the same vicinity of eastern Outagamie County.

List of past representatives

References 

Wisconsin State Assembly districts
Brown County, Wisconsin
Outagamie County, Wisconsin